RFK is a 2002 American historical drama television film directed by Robert Dornhelm and written by Hank Steinberg. The film stars Linus Roache as Robert F. Kennedy. David Paymer, Martin Donovan, Jacob Vargas, Marnie McPhail, Sergio Di Zio, Sean Sullivan, Ving Rhames and James Cromwell also star. It premiered on the FX Network on August 25, 2002. 

The film takes place through the eyes of RFK after his brother John F. Kennedy's assassination in 1963. As he lives through the loss, he starts to identify himself as a political figure, not just the former president's brother. He makes it official with a 1968 United States presidential election bid in order, what he says, to "save the Democratic Party". During his campaign, in which the American people showed great support for him, RFK was shot and killed by pro-Palestinian activist Sirhan Sirhan as a statement against Kennedy's unwavering support of Israel.

The film was shot in Hamilton, Ontario, Canada.

Cast
Linus Roache as Robert F. Kennedy
David Paymer as Dick Goodwin
Martin Donovan as John F. Kennedy
Jacob Vargas as Cesar Chavez
Marnie McPhail as Ethel Kennedy
Sergio Di Zio as Adam Walinsky
Sean Sullivan as Stephen Edward Smith
Ving Rhames as Judge Jones
James Cromwell as Lyndon B. Johnson
Kevin Hare as Ted Kennedy
Rodger Barton as Sheriff
Corinne Conley as Rose Kennedy
Phil Craig as John A. McCone
Jordan Fennell as Jordan
Neil Foster as Mayor
David Gardner as Joseph Kennedy, Sr.
Judith Goodwin as Evelyn Lincoln
Nigel Hamer as Stand-up Reporter
Jonathan Higgins as Peter Edelman
David Huband as Reporter #1
Bill Lake as Mr. Murphy
Colm Magner as Reporter #2
Dwight McFee as Painter
Michael Rhoades as Reporter #3
Kim Roberts as Joshua's mother
Sheila Shotton as Speech Therapist
Fernando Valladares as Priest
Joshua Watkis as Joshua
Timm Zemanek as Dr. Coles

References

External links

2002 television films
2002 films
2002 drama films
2000s American films
2000s English-language films
2000s historical drama films
2000s political drama films
American drama television films
American historical drama films
American political drama films
Cultural depictions of John F. Kennedy
Cultural depictions of Robert F. Kennedy
Cultural depictions of Lyndon B. Johnson
Films about assassinations
Films about Robert F. Kennedy
Films directed by Robert Dornhelm
Films scored by Harald Kloser
Films set in 1963
Films set in 1968
Films set in Los Angeles
Films set in New York City
Films set in Virginia
Films set in the White House
Films shot in Hamilton, Ontario
FX Networks original films
Historical television films